William John Boland (born 6 August 1975) is an Irish football coach and former professional footballer.

He notably played in the Premier League for Coventry City, and in the Football League for Cardiff City and Hartlepool United and in his native Ireland for Limerick. He was capped by both the Republic of Ireland U17 and Republic of Ireland U21 teams.

Following his retirement he became a youth coach at Middlesbrough before taking up a role as academy director of Limerick. In 2017 he spent a short spell as interim manager of the club.

Playing career
Born in Ennis, County Clare, Boland started his career with Coventry City, making over 60 league appearances, before moving to Cardiff City in 1999. Despite scoring on his debut on 7 August 1999 in a 1–1 draw with Millwall, Boland initially struggled to find form in Cardiff, his time not helped by a broken leg early into his second season at the club, sustained in a match against Barnet. It was not until he recovered from the injury that he began to settle in the side and the following season he was awarded the club's player of the year award due to his performances in a three-man midfield alongside Mark Bonner and Graham Kavanagh. After helping the team win promotion to Division One he gradually fell out of favour under new manager Dave Jones.

The Irishman was Cardiff City's longest serving player, having been at the club for seven years and starting over 200 games, before leaving when his contract expired in the summer of 2006. He spent a short unsuccessful time on trial at Swansea City before in August 2006 signing for Hartlepool United.

Boland became Danny Wilson's first signing. His tough-tackling is something that Wilson had been looking to add to the squad and he agreed terms at The Vic after being out of contract at Cardiff in the summer. His leadership skills and experience were another part of the reason that Pools were quick to move for him when he became available.

Boland is a hard tackling midfielder with good battling qualities; he has represented his country at Under-21 level.

Boland announced his retirement from professional football on 21 October 2009 having not featured in a professional match for 14 months due to knee problems. His last appearance came on 23 August 2008 in a 1–0 defeat to Stockport County. He scored his only goal for Hartlepool in a 4–2 win over Colchester United on 9 August 2008.

Boland came out of retirement in May 2010 to sign for Limerick. Boland made his League of Ireland debut as a substitute, which turned out to be his only appearance, at Athlone Town on 8 May.

Coaching career
Boland moved into coaching and worked with the Middlesbrough under-14 team as well as working at Hartlepool College.

On 5 April 2017, Boland was appointed interim manager of the side following the departure of Martin Russell. He spent one month in charge of the side before the club appointed Neil McDonald as Russell's permanent replacement.

Honours
Cardiff City
Football League Division Two play-off winner: 1
 2002–03
FAW Premier Cup winner: 1
 2001–02

Hartlepool United
League Two runners-up: 2006–07

References

External links
Boland's Official Hartlepool United F.C. profile  
Vital Hartlepool Profile: Willie Boland

1975 births
Living people
People from Ennis
Sportspeople from County Clare
Republic of Ireland association footballers
Republic of Ireland youth international footballers
Republic of Ireland under-21 international footballers
Association football midfielders
Coventry City F.C. players
Cardiff City F.C. players
Hartlepool United F.C. players
Limerick F.C. players
Premier League players
English Football League players
League of Ireland players
Republic of Ireland expatriate association footballers
Expatriate footballers in Wales
Irish expatriate sportspeople in Wales
Expatriate footballers in England
Irish expatriate sportspeople in England
Republic of Ireland football managers
Limerick F.C. managers
Hartlepool United F.C. non-playing staff
Middlesbrough F.C. non-playing staff